Panchamakara or Panchatattva, also known as the Five Ms, is the Tantric term for the five transgressive substances used in a Tantric practice.

Taboo-breaking elements are only practiced literally by "left-hand path" tantrics (vāmācārins), whereas "right-hand path" tantrics (dakṣiṇācārins) oppose these.

Interpretations of the Panchamakaras

Arthur Avalon (Sir John Woodroffe)

In the introduction of his translation of the Mahanirvana Tantra, 
Sir John Woodroffe, under the pseudonym Arthur Avalon, describes the Panchamakara thus:

Vamachara and dakshinachara 

In the right-handed path, the Dakshinachara, as described for example by the spiritual leader Prabhat Ranjan Sarkar, the five M's have dual meanings, one crude (left-handed, Vamachara) and one subtle (right-handed, Dakshinachara).

According to Sarkar, the purpose of the Five M's is dual: for people to practice yoga sadhana (meditation) while in the "midst of crude enjoyments" and then gradually reduce the consumption of wine, meat, fish, etc. and not to overindulge in sexual activities; and after learning to resist the allure of these activities, to engage in the subtle practices of Tantra meditation.

See also 

 Ganachakra
 Yogini#Panchamakara

References

Cited sources 

 
 
 
 
 

Tantric practices